In mathematics, a weakly compact cardinal is a certain kind of cardinal number introduced by ; weakly compact cardinals are large cardinals, meaning that their existence cannot be proven  from the standard axioms of set theory. (Tarski originally called them "not strongly incompact" cardinals.)

Formally, a cardinal κ is defined to be weakly compact if it is uncountable and for every function f: [κ]  2  → {0, 1} there is a set of cardinality κ that is homogeneous for f.  In this context, [κ]  2  means the set of 2-element subsets of κ, and a subset S of κ is homogeneous for f if and only if either all of [S]2 maps to 0 or all of it maps to 1.

The name "weakly compact" refers to the fact that if a cardinal is weakly compact then a certain related infinitary language satisfies a version of the compactness theorem; see below. 

Every weakly compact cardinal is a reflecting cardinal, and is also a limit of reflecting cardinals. This means also that weakly compact cardinals are Mahlo cardinals, and the set of Mahlo cardinals less than a given weakly compact cardinal is stationary.

Equivalent formulations 

The following are equivalent for any uncountable cardinal κ:

 κ is weakly compact.
 for every λ<κ, natural number n ≥ 2, and function f: [κ]n → λ, there is a set of cardinality κ that is homogeneous for f. 
 κ is inaccessible and has the tree property, that is, every tree of height κ has either a level of size κ or a branch of size κ.
 Every linear order of cardinality κ has an ascending or a descending sequence of order type κ.
 κ is -indescribable.
 κ has the extension property. In other words, for all U ⊂ Vκ there exists a transitive set X with κ ∈ X, and a subset S ⊂ X, such that (Vκ, ∈, U) is an elementary substructure of (X, ∈, S). Here, U and S are regarded as unary predicates.
 For every set S of cardinality κ of subsets of κ, there is a non-trivial κ-complete filter that decides S.
 κ is κ-unfoldable.
 κ is inaccessible and the infinitary language Lκ,κ satisfies the weak compactness theorem. 
 κ is inaccessible and the infinitary language Lκ,ω satisfies the weak compactness theorem.

A language Lκ,κ is said to satisfy the weak compactness theorem if whenever Σ is a set of sentences of cardinality at most κ and every subset with less than κ elements has a model, then Σ has a model. Strongly compact cardinals are defined in a similar way without the restriction on the cardinality of the set of sentences.

See also
List of large cardinal properties

References 

 

 
 

Large cardinals